Henry King (February 8, 1906 – August 8, 1974) was an American orchestra leader and pianist who achieved significant success as a recording artist, hotel bandleader, and as leader of radio orchestras.  He was most popular in the 1930s and 1940s.  Today he is remembered as the orchestra leader of the Burns and Allen radio program.

Biography
Henry King was born in February 8, 1906.  He initially intended to be a classical concert pianist, having studied under Walter Damrosch for six years.  Finding pop music to be more lucrative, he organized his first band in the early 1930s.  The band was a society band, not a jazz band, and as the band became successful it found engagement at the most prestigious hotels.

Over his career, King believed his band to have broadcast more than 5000 remotes. His theme was the Mitchell Parish-Frank Signorelli composition, "A Blues Serenade". King became the band leader of the Burns and Allen Campbell's Tomato Juice Program "Adventures of Gracie" in 1936, his first appearance was on September 2 that year. During this time period, he resided in San Francisco but traveled to Hollywood the day of the broadcast. He married Baltimore resident Vilma Lewis in January 1937 in the very early hours of the morning, given special dispensation as their careers interfered with a marriage during normal hours.  This event was incorporated into the January 20, 1937, Burns and Allen program. When Burns and Allen left CBS for NBC and a new show sponsored by Grape Nuts at the end of March 1937, King did not follow them on radio, but took on an extended appointment at the Palmer House in Chicago instead. Later in his career he modified his style to focus on Latin American-influenced music, becoming an early-adopter of rhumba and samba rhythms.  In 1940 he was living in New York City on West 92nd Street.

King died in Houston, Texas, on August 8, 1974, following a lengthy period of poor health.

King was reviewed as a superior emcee, presenting acts in a low-key manner that best suited his style.

Selected discography

Filmography
1938 – Sunset Murder Case
1942 – The Yanks Are Coming
1943 – Spotlight Scandals
1944 – Sweethearts of the U.S.A.
1945 – Out of This World

References

External links

1906 births
1974 deaths
American bandleaders
Victor Records artists
Columbia Records artists
Decca Records artists
Place of birth missing